Lieutenant General Sir Arthur Francis Smith,  (9 December 1890 – 8 August 1977) was a senior British Army officer who served during the Second World War.

Military career
Smith attended the Royal Military College, Sandhurst and was commissioned as a second lieutenant into the Coldstream Guards on 3 September 1910, alongside Charles Loyd, like Smith, a future general.

He served in the First World War as an adjutant with the 3rd Battalion, Coldstream Guards on the Western Front from 1914 before becoming a General Staff Officer (GSO) in France in 1915.

During the interwar period he became a GSO at London District and then adjutant at the Royal Military College, Sandhurst from 1921. It was during this time that he compiled the 100 Days Bible Study for cadet officers. He became Commandant at the Guards Depot in 1924 and then moved back to London District in 1927. He was made commanding officer of the 2nd Battalion, Coldstream Guards in 1930 and then Commander of the Coldstream Guards and Regimental District in 1934. In 1938 he became a Brigadier on the General Staff of British Troops in Egypt.

He served in the Second World War initially as chief of staff at Middle East Command until 1942 when he became Major-General commanding the Brigade of Guards and General Officer Commanding London District. He was appointed General Officer Commanding-in-Chief for Persia and Iraq Command in 1944, and awarded the Soviet Order of Kutuzov, 2nd Class.

After the war he was made General Officer Commanding-in-Chief for Eastern Command, India in 1945. He became Chief of the General Staff in India in 1946 and Commander of British Forces in India and Pakistan in 1947; he retired in 1948.

He was Lieutenant of the Tower of London from 1948 to 1951. He was a religious man who became Chairman of the British Evangelical Alliance and President of the World Evangelical Fellowship.

Publications
While a captain with the Coldstream Guards, he was adjutant of the Royal Military College, Sandhurst, from 1921 to 1924. During that time he realised the need for a book to help Gentlemen Cadets understand their Bibles. He therefore compiled 100 Days Bible Study, of which over 120,000 copies have been printed, and which has been translated in whole or in part into several different languages. It is still in print today.

References

Bibliography

External links
British Army Officers 1939−1945
Generals of World War II

 

|-
 

|-
 

1890 births
1977 deaths
Military personnel from London
Academics of the Royal Military College, Sandhurst
British Army generals of World War II
British Army personnel of World War I
Coldstream Guards officers
Companions of the Distinguished Service Order
English Christian Scientists
British Army lieutenant generals
Graduates of the Royal Military College, Sandhurst
Knights Commander of the Order of the Bath
Knights Commander of the Order of the British Empire
People educated at Eton College
Recipients of the Military Cross